"Don't Go (Girls and Boys)" is a song written and recorded by Canadian singer Fefe Dobson with producer Jay Levine. It was released May 25, 2004 and serves as the fourth and final single from Dobson's self-titled debut album. Although it did not appear on the initial release of the album, the song was appended to later pressings.  The song was featured in a 2004 Tommy Hilfiger commercial that starred Dobson.

Critical reception
Rashaun Hall of Billboard wrote that "Don't Go (Girls and Boys)" is "as nostalgic as it is catchy" and is an "instantly infectious jam."

Track listing
CD single
 "Don't Go (Girls and Boys)" (Fefe Dobson, Jay Levine) — 3:18
 "Don't Let Me Fall" (Dobson, Levine) — 3:55

There is a version "For Promotional Use Only" sometimes referred to as a DJ single, with just the song and a brief "CALLOUT".

Music video 
The music video for "Don't Go" was directed by Rainbows & Vampires and is set in New York City, with references to subways, 43rd Street, and CBGB in both the song and video. The video starred Dobson and Drake Bell running away from two unidentified men in black suits and culminates with Dobson performing the song on-stage at CBGB.

Chart performance

Release history

References 

Fefe Dobson songs
2004 singles
Songs written by Fefe Dobson
2003 songs
Island Records singles
Songs written by Jason Levine